Kallikrein-related peptidase 4 is a protein which in humans is encoded by the KLK4 gene.

Kallikreins are a subgroup of serine proteases having diverse physiological functions. Growing evidence suggests that many kallikreins are implicated in carcinogenesis and some have potential as novel cancer and other disease biomarkers. In particular, they may serve as biomarkers for both prostate cancer and breast cancer.

This gene is one of the fifteen kallikrein subfamily members located in a cluster on chromosome 19. In some tissues its expression is hormonally regulated. The expression pattern of a similar mouse protein in murine developing teeth supports a role for the protein in the degradation of enamel proteins. Alternate splice variants for this gene have been described, but their biological validity has not been determined.

References

Further reading

External links
 The MEROPS online database for peptidases and their inhibitors: S01.251